Kolah Duz Mahalleh (also Romanized as Kolāh Dūz Maḩalleh) is a village in Malfejan Rural District, in the Central District of Siahkal County, Gilan Province, Iran. At the 2006 census, its population was 201, in 56 families.

References 

Populated places in Siahkal County